Mercedes Coghen Alberdingk-Thijm (born August 2, 1962 in Madrid) is a former field hockey player from Spain, who captained the Women's National Team that won the golden medal at the 1992 Summer Olympics on home soil (Barcelona). She was a member of the committee of the Madrid 2012 bid and chair of the Madrid 2016 bid to host Summer Olympic Games.

External links
 
 

1962 births
Spanish female field hockey players
Spanish people of Dutch descent
Olympic field hockey players of Spain
Field hockey players at the 1992 Summer Olympics
Living people
Olympic gold medalists for Spain
Field hockey players from Madrid
Olympic medalists in field hockey
Medalists at the 1992 Summer Olympics
20th-century Spanish women